Lisa or LISA may refer to:

People

People with the mononym

 Lisa Lisa (born 1967), American actress and lead singer of the Cult Jam
 Lisa (Japanese musician, born 1974), stylized "LISA", Japanese singer and producer
 Lisa Komine (born 1978), Japanese singer formerly known as Lisa, stylized "lisa"
 Lisa (South Korean singer) (born 1980), South Korean singer and musical theatre actress
 LiSA (Japanese musician, born 1987), Japanese singer
 Lisa (rapper) (born 1997), Thai rapper, member of K-pop group Blackpink
 Lisa (French musician) (born 1997), French singer and actress

People with the name
Lisa (given name), a feminine given name
 Lisa (surname), a list of notable people with the surname

Places

Romania
 Lisa, Brașov
 Lisa, Teleorman
 Lisa, a village in Schitu, Olt
 Lisa River

United States
 Fort Lisa (Nebraska) (1812–1823), a trading post in the US
 Fort Lisa (North Dakota) (1809-1812), a trading post in the US

Elsewhere
Lisa, Ivanjica, a municipality in Serbia
 Lisa, a village in Ifo, Ogun, Nigeria
 La Lisa, a municipality of Havana, Cuba

Arts, entertainment and media

Films
 Lisa (1962 film) or The Inspector, a drama starring Stephen Boyd and Dolores Hart
 Lisa (1978 film), an Indian Malayalam-language film
 Lisa (1990 film), a crime thriller film starring Staci Keanan and Cheryl Ladd
 Lisa (2001 film), a French romantic war film starring Marion Cotillard

Other uses in arts, entertainment, and media
 Lisa (TV series)
 "Lisa", a 1960 single by Jeanne Black
Lisa: The Painful RPG, a post-apocalyptic role-playing video game
 Lisa Lisa and Cult Jam, an American band
 "Lisa", a main lyric theme by Franz Waxman from the Rear Window film

Organizations
 LISA Academy (Little Scholars of Arkansas), a public charter high school in Little Rock, Arkansas
 Localization Industry Standards Association, from 1990 to 2011 a Swiss-based trade body concerning the translation of computer software
 Louisiana Independent School Association, a defunct athletic association of segregation academies

Science and technology

Computing
 Lisa (computer chip), graphics assistance chip in the Amiga computer in 1992
 LISA (Language for Instruction Set Architecture)
 LISA (organization), the USENIX special interest group for system administrators
 Apple Lisa computer, the precursor to the Apple Macintosh
 Library and Information Science Abstracts, an abstracting and indexing tool designed for library professionals
 Lisa assembler, a 6502 assembler for Apple II
 LISA+, a traffic engineering software package for microsimulation
 Lisp-based Intelligent Software Agents, a production-rule system implemented in the Common Lisp Object System (CLOS)

Other uses in science and technology
 Laser Interferometer Space Antenna, previously called eLISA (Evolved Laser Interferometer Space Antenna), a planned European-American Space Agency space mission designed to measure gravitational waves
 LISA Pathfinder, a technology demonstrator for eLISA
 Local indicators of spatial association, statistics that evaluate the existence of clusters in the spatial arrangement of a given variable
 Tropical Storm Lisa (disambiguation), various hurricanes, cyclones and a tropical storm

Other uses
 Lisa (mythology), a creator deity in Dahomeyan religion
 Liaison Interne Satellite Aérogare, one of the two shuttle rail lines of CDGVAL at Charles de Gaulle International Airport
 Lifetime ISA, a UK savings and investment product

See also
 Lisa Lisa and Cult Jam, an American band
 Elizabeth (disambiguation)
 Leesa
 Liisa (given name)
 Liza